Lyn Thériault, formerly known as Lyn Faust, is a politician in Montreal, Quebec, Canada. She has served on the Montreal city council since 2001 as a member of the Vision Montreal party. She was also an elected member of the Commission scolaire de Montréal from 1998 to 2007.

Thériault was the borough mayor of Mercier–Hochelaga-Maisonneuve from 2005 to 2009 and was a member of the Montreal executive committee (i.e., the municipal cabinet) from 2009 to 2011.

Private career
Thériault has held administrative positions with the Fédération des comités de parents de la province de Québec, the Fédération des comités de parents de l'Île de Montréal, and the Association canadienne d'éducation de la langue français. She served as a parent school commissioner on the Montreal Catholic School Commission in 1993–94. She has also been a member of Montreal's Board of Trade and Chamber of Commerce and has coordinated events such as the Montreal Chamber Music Festival.

School commissioner
Thériault was elected to the Commission scolaire de Montréal in the 1998 elections as a candidate of the conservative Regroupement scolaire confessionnel (RSC). The RSC was defeated in this election but later formed a de facto majority on council in alliance with five defectors from the governing Mouvement pour une école moderne et ouverte (MÉMO).

Thériault later became a founding member of the Collectif pour la réussite et l'épanouissement de l'enfant (CRÉE), a successor party to the RSC. In March 2003, she was appointed to the commission's executive. She was re-elected as a CRÉE candidate in the 2003 elections, in which MÉMO won a landslide majority. After serving in opposition for the next four years, she did not seek re-election in 2007.

City councillor
Thériault was first elected to the Montreal city council in the 2001 municipal election for the east-end division of Louis-Riel. Gérald Tremblay's Montreal Island Citizens Union (MICU) won a majority in this election, and Thériault served as a member of the opposition. By virtue of her position on city council, she also served on the Mercier–Hochelaga-Maisonneuve borough council.

Borough mayor
Thériault was elected as borough mayor of Mercier–Hochelaga-Maisonneuve in the 2005 municipal election, defeating Pierre Bélanger, a former Parti Québécois (PQ) cabinet minister who ran for MICU. As a borough mayor, she also continued to serve on city council. Gérald Tremblay was re-elected as mayor of Montreal in this election, and MICU won another majority on the Montreal city council. In November 2005, Tremblay appointed Thériault as one of two opposition members on a fifteen-member island council responsible for services such as public transit and the police.

In 2006, Thériault argued that Montreal's formula for determining borough budgets discriminated against her area of the city. She later opposed a plan to rename Montreal's Park Avenue and Bleury Street after former Quebec premier Robert Bourassa, and in early 2007 she criticized a municipal plan to grant a ten-year untendered contract for a non-profit organization to oversee Montreal's recyclable waste.

In the buildup to the 2009 municipal election, Thériault lost her bid for renomination as Vision Montreal's borough mayor candidate to Réal Ménard, a Bloc Québécois (BQ) member of the House of Commons of Canada. She instead ran for and was re-elected to city council for the Louis-Riel division, defeating Union Montreal incumbent Richer Dompierre. She continues to serve on the borough council.

Municipal executive
Gérald Tremblay was re-elected to a third term as mayor of Montreal in the 2009 election, and his Union Montreal party again won a majority of seats on council. After the election, Tremblay broke with tradition by appointing members of opposition parties to the Montreal executive committee. Thériault was chosen as Vision Montreal's representative, with responsibility for social and community development, family, and seniors.

Reports from the Montreal Gazette indicate that the presence of opposition members in Tremblay's cabinet did not change the adversarial nature of Montreal municipal politics. Thériault absented herself when Vision Montreal voted against Tremblay's 2010 budget.

Tremblay removed Thériault from the executive committee on March 22, 2011, after she and sixteen other Vision Montreal councillors were cited by Quebec's chief electoral officer for illegal loan guarantees in the 2009 election. Vision Montreal contended that the guarantees were made in error and that the party had itself raised the matter with Quebec election officials. Tremblay said that Thériault had performed well on the executive, but that he could not keep her in government following the citation.

Opposition councillor
Thériault was elected as president of the Vision Montreal caucus in December 2012.

Provincial politics
Thériault ran as a Quebec Liberal Party candidate in a provincial by-election in Bourget in 2008, centring her campaign around what she described as "a pro-family theme." She was defeated by Parti Québécois candidate Maka Kotto.

Electoral record

Municipal

Provincial

School trustee

References

External links
Municipal biography

Living people
Montreal city councillors
People from Mercier–Hochelaga-Maisonneuve
Mayors of places in Quebec
Women mayors of places in Quebec
Quebec school board members
Women municipal councillors in Canada
Year of birth missing (living people)